The Islamic Organization of Latin America (IOLA), headquartered in Buenos Aires, Argentina, is considered the most active organization in Latin America in promoting Islamic affiliated endeavors. The IOLA holds events to promote the unification of Muslims living in Latin America, as well as the propagation of Islam.

At a meeting, on July 19, 2005 the heads of the Islamic cultural centers assigned the Islamic Educational, Scientific and Cultural Organization (ISESCO) to prepare comprehensive studies and reports on the Islamic cultural work in Latin America as well as recommend practical proposals and field projects. The head of IOLA, Muhammad Yousef Hajer, was assigned to prepare a directory for the Muslim cadres in the region in coordination with the heads of the Islamic cultural centers and the Islamic societies in Latin America.

See also
 Latin American Muslims
 Arab Argentine
 Arab Brazilian
 Latino Muslims

References

External links
IOLA Website

Islamic organisations based in Argentina
Islam in South America